Laguta, also transliterated Lahuta (Cyrillic: Лагута), is a surname. Notable people with the surname include:

 Artem Laguta (born 1990), Russian motorcycle speedway rider, brother of Grigory
 Grigory Laguta (born 1984), Russian-born Latvian motorcycle speedway rider
 Hennadiy Lahuta (born 1974), Ukrainian politician

See also
 

East Slavic-language surnames